Guido Andreozzi was the defending champion but chose not to defend his title.

Víctor Estrella Burgos won the title after defeating Damir Džumhur 7–6(7–4), 6–4 in the final.

Seeds

Draw

Finals

Top half

Bottom half

References
Main Draw
Qualifying Draw

Milex Open - Singles
2017 Singles